Mário Covas Almeida Júnior ( or ; 21 April 1930 – 6 March 2001) was a Brazilian politician.

Biography 
Covas studied engineering at the Polytechnic School of the University of São Paulo. He entered politics in his native city of Santos, in the state of São Paulo.

He was elected federal representative, mayor of São Paulo City (1983–1985), senator and twice Governor of the state of São Paulo (1994–1998 and 1998–2001). He was a founder and member of PMDB (Party of the Brazilian Democratic Movement) and later PSDB (Brazilian Social Democracy Party). In 1989, he was the PSDB presidential candidate, receiving 11% of the votes. In the run-off of that election, he supported, like his party, Luiz Inácio Lula da Silva.

He took a medical leave of absence on 22 January 2001, due to bladder cancer found during an operation to remove a prostate tumor.  He died later the same year. His successor was his deputy, Geraldo Alckmin.

External links
 Fundação Mario Covas biography

References

|-

|-

1930 births
2001 deaths
People from Santos, São Paulo
Governors of São Paulo (state)
Mayors of São Paulo
Brazilian people of Spanish descent
University of São Paulo alumni
Brazilian Social Democracy Party politicians
Brazilian Democratic Movement politicians
Candidates for President of Brazil
Members of the Federal Senate (Brazil)
Deaths from cancer in São Paulo (state)
Deaths from bladder cancer